The Iyri-Suu Forest Reserve) is located in the Ortok rural community, Naryn District, Naryn Region, Kyrgyzstan. It was established in 1975 with a purpose of conservation of natural Schrenk's Spruce (Picea schrenkiana) forest. The forest reserve occupies 395 hectares.

References

Naryn Region
Protected areas established in 1975
Forest reserves of Kyrgyzstan
1975 establishments in the Kirghiz Soviet Socialist Republic